Leon E. Giuffreda (August 1, 1913 – November 8, 1999) was an American businessman and politician from New York.

Life
He was born on August 1, 1913, in Brooklyn, New York City. In 1941, he moved to Centereach, in Suffolk County. There he engaged in the real estate and insurance business. He married Rose M. Gazzano (1913–2007), and they had two daughters.

Giuffreda was a member of the New York State Senate from 1966 to 1976, sitting in the 176th, 177th, 178th, 179th, 180th and 181st New York State Legislatures.

He died on November 8, 1999, in Boca Raton, Florida; and was buried at the Municipal Cemetery and Mausoleum there.

Sources

External links
 

1913 births
1999 deaths
People from Centereach, New York
Republican Party New York (state) state senators
People from Brooklyn
People from Boca Raton, Florida
20th-century American politicians